Ramotholo Rafael Sefako (born 1971) is a South African astrophysicist. He is one of the first three black astro-physicists in South Africa.

Biography
Sefako matriculated with distinction from Khukhune High School in Botha-Bothe-Lesotho and obtained his BSc degree at the University of Lesotho.

He received his doctorate in astronomy from the Potchefstroom University for Christian Higher Education (abbreviated PU for CHE).

In 2005, he joined South African Astronomical Observatory (SAAO) as a post-doctoral fellow, and later a Southern African Large Telescope(SALT) astronomer. Currently, he is the head of the Telescope Operations (TOPS) Division at SAAO.

Astronomy Research

Dr Ramotholo Sefako's research interests include multi-wavelength studies of blazars and pulsar-driven nebulae to unravel how these objects produce high energies, up to gamma rays. Moreover, he has published various journals collaboration with other physicists around the world.

Notes

1971 births
Living people
South African astronomers
North-West University alumni
National University of Lesotho alumni